Höganäs BK is a Swedish football club located in Höganäs in Skåne County.

Background
Höganäs Bollklubb were founded in 1913 and for many years before and after the Second World War played in Division 2, which at that time was the second tier of Swedish football.  In the more recent decades Höganäs BK has participated mainly in the middle and lower divisions of the Swedish football league system.

The cradle of Scanian football is in Kullen, as the rector Lars Hallén took the sport to Scania from Zealand together with Danish miners, and Scania's representatives in the Swedish football championship therefore used to be Väsby FK during the first years. Höganäs BK passed on this legacy.

The club played between the seasons 1931/32 and 1960 for a full 28 seasons in the second highest division in football. In the 1952/53 season, they became second behind Kalmar FF who were promoted straight up to Allsvenskan.

The home ground is the Sports Center in Lerberget since 2015. At the old home ground Julivallen, the record attendance is 5.283 against Halmstad BK in the 2nd highest league division (today's Superettan) October 25, 1953.

The club currently plays in Division 2 Västra Götaland which is the fourth tier of Swedish football.

The club plays in red shirts, blue shorts and red socks.

Höganäs BK are affiliated to Skånes Fotbollförbund.

Recent history
In recent seasons Höganäs BK have competed in the following divisions:

2015 – Division II,  Västra Götaland
2014 – Division II,  Västra Götaland
2013 – Division III, Sydvästra Götaland
2012 – Division III, Sydvästra Götaland
2011 – Division III, Sydvästra Götaland
2010 – Division III, Sydvästra Götaland
2009 – Division III, Sydvästra Götaland
2008 – Division III, Södra Götaland
2007 – Division III, Sydvästra Götaland
2006 – Division III, Sydvästra Götaland
2005 – Division IV, Skåne Västra
2004 – Division IV, Skåne Västra
2003 – Division IV, Skåne Västra
2002 – Division V, Skåne Nordvästra
2001 – Division IV, Skåne Nordvästra
2000 – Division IV, Skåne Norra
1999 – Division V, Skåne Nordvästra

Attendances

In recent seasons Höganäs BK have had the following average attendances:

Footnotes

External links
 Höganäs BK – Official website
 Höganäs BK on Facebook

Sport in Skåne County
Football clubs in Skåne County
Association football clubs established in 1913
1913 establishments in Sweden